The Belgian Women's Third Division is the fourth top level women's football league of Belgium. It started in 1990 for only one season. In season 2001-02 they reinstated the division again. The competition is divided in 2 series so  there are 2 winner who will promote to Belgian Women's Second Division.

Format
In the league's season, 14 teams participated in Series A and 12 teams in Series B, playing a double round-robin schedule to decide the champion.

2018-19 Teams

Series A

Series B

Champions

Chronology

Series A

1990 RC Harelbeke
2002 DV. Famkes Merkem
2003 K.SV. Jabbeke
2004 FC. EXC. Kaart
2005 K.SV.Jabbeke
2006 K.Achterbroek V.V.
2007 KV.Cercle Melle 
2008 Damesvoetbal Davo Waregem 
2009 Miecroob Veltem
2010 Oud-Heverlee Leuven B
2011 K.Massenhoven VC.
2012 Eendracht Aalst
2013 Club Brugge B
2014 AA Gent B

Series B

1990 F.C.Turnhout
2002 K.Vlimmeren Sport
2003 K. Patro Maasmechelen
2004 FC. Fémina W.S. Woluwe
2005 FC. Fémina Braine-Rebecq 
2006 R.CS.Ways-Genappe 
2007 V.V.D.G. Lommel
2008 R.FC.Rhisnois 
2009 Standard Luik B
2010 Dames Voetbal Opglabbeek 
2011 Wallonia Club Sibret
2012 Zonhven DV
2013 Tongeren DV
2014 Wolfsdonk Sport

References

External links
women.soccerway.com, Standings, results and fixtures
www.belgiuanfootbal.be, archive

4